The 2019 Derbyshire Dales District Council election was held on 2 May 2019 to elect all 39 councillors for Derbyshire Dales District Council. This was on the same day as other local elections.

The Conservative Party retained control of the council for the fifth consecutive election, with a significantly reduced majority of 1.

No wards were uncontested for the first time since 1999.

Summary

Election result

|-

Ward results

Ashbourne North

Ashbourne South

Bakewell

Bradwell

Brailsford

Calver

Carsington Water

Chatsworth

Clifton and Bradley

Darley Dale

Dovedale and Parwich

Doveridge and Sudbury

Hartington and Taddington

Hathersage and Eyam

Hulland

Lathkill and Bradford

Litton and Longstone

Masson

Matlock All Saints

Matlock St. Giles

Norbury

Stanton

Tideswell

Winster and South Darley

Wirksworth

By-elections between 2019 and 2023

Masson by-election

Wirksworth by-election

Carsington Water by-election

References 

2019 English local elections
Derbyshire Dales District Council elections
May 2019 events in the United Kingdom
2010s in Derbyshire